The fixture between AIK and Hammarby is a local derby in Stockholm, Sweden.

History
The clubs first met in a competitive game in 1920.

Rivalry culture
The rivalry between AIK and Hammarby is one of the most important derbies in Sweden. AIK and Hammarby are clubs with considerable support in Sweden; in 2015, two of the games between these two teams had an attendance of 41 063 and 41 630 respectively.
23 of September 2018 a derby between these two teams had an attendance of 49,034. It's still the record for a derby in the Nordic countries.  

AIK was founded in the district of Norrmalm, which constitutes the most central part of Stockholm City Centre, and therefore have a following in the northern parts of the city centre, as well as a strong concentration of fans in the northwest, roughly along the blue line of the Metro. Hammarby consider Södermalm, the southern district of the city centre where the club was founded, and the boroughs south of said district, their heartland. (Both clubs also maintain a cross-town rivalry with Djurgårdens IF, who counts the Östermalm district, the eastern part of the city centre, as their stronghold.)

Matches

AIK in the league at home

Hammarby in the league at home

Cup

Records

Biggest wins (5+ goals)

Longest runs

Most consecutive wins

Most appearances

Goalscorers

Top scorer for the club

Consecutive goalscoring

Shared player history

Transfers

 Axel Nilsson (Hammarby to AIK) (1932)
 Sture Gillström (Hammarby to AIK) (1933)
 Sture Gillström (AIK to Hammarby) (1934)
 Sven Bergqvist (Hammarby to AIK) (1935)
 Sven Bergqvist (AIK to Hammarby) (1935)
 Emil Haag (AIK to Hammarby) (1939)
 Kurt Kjellström (AIK to Hammarby) (1940)
 Svante Granlund (AIK to Hammarby) (1942)
 Gunnar Södergren (AIK to Hammarby) (1943)
 Gunnar Södergren (Hammarby to AIK) (1944)
 Bertil Bäckvall (Hammarby to AIK) (1946)
 Ragnar Blom (Hammarby to AIK) (1946)
 Lennart Skoglund (Hammarby to AIK) (1949)
 Gerhard Hill (AIK to Hammarby) (1949)
 Olle Nyström (AIK to Hammarby) (1950)
 Georg Kraemer (AIK to Hammarby) (1951)
 Hans Möller (AIK to Hammarby) (1951)
 Rune Larsson (AIK to Hammarby) (1953)
 Lars Boman (AIK to Hammarby) (1954)
 Axel Ericsson (Hammarby to AIK) (1954)
 Axel Ericsson (AIK to Hamamrby) (1957)
 Benny Söderling (AIK to Hamamrby) (1966)
 Ulf Tjernström (AIK to Hammarby) (1990)
 Hernando Salvatore Labbé Solinas (Hammarby to AIK) (1993)
 Kim Bergstrand (AIK to Hammarby) (1995)
 Cesar Pacha (AIK to Hammarby) (1998)
 Benjamin Kibebe (Hammarby to AIK) (1999)
 Joe Mendes (Hammarby to AIK) (2022)

Played for both clubs

 Mikael Samuelsson (Hammarby to Tyresö FF to AIK) (1986)
 Hans Eskilsson (Hammarby to Sporting CP to SC Braga to AIK to GD Estoril Praia to Hammarby) (1990, 1992)
 Hans Bergh (Hammarby to Degerfors IF to Helsingborgs IF to AIK) (1998)
 Andreas Alm (Hammarby to Kongsvinger IL to AIK) (1998)
 Alexander Östlund (AIK to Vitória S.C. to IFK Norrköping to Hammarby) (2003)
 Sebastián Eguren (Hammarby to Villarreal to AIK) (2010)
 Oscar Krusnell (AIK's academy to Sunderland to Hammarby) (2017)

Played for one club, managed the other
 Andreas Alm (played for AIK and Hammarby, managed AIK)
 Sven Bergqvist (played for AIK and Hammarby, managed Hammarby)
 Michael Borgqvist (played for AIK, managed Hammarby)
 Georg Kraemer (played for AIK, managed Hammarby)
 Per Kaufeldt (played for AIK, managed AIK and Hammarby)
 Rolf Zetterlund (played for AIK, managed AIK and Hammarby)

Managed both clubs

1 Only competitive matches are counted.

See also
Local derby
Djurgårdens IF–Hammarby IF rivalry
Tvillingderbyt

References

External links

Football derbies in Sweden
AIK Fotboll
Hammarby Fotboll
Football in Stockholm